Xinzhuang Fuduxin is a station on the Taoyuan Airport MRT located on the border of Xinzhuang and Taishan, New Taipei, Taiwan.

Station overview
It is only served by commuter trains; express trains do not stop at this station.

History
It opened for trial service on 2 February 2017, and for commercial service 2 March 2017 with the opening of the Taipei-Huanbei section of the Airport MRT.

Station layout

Around the station
 New Taipei City Exhibition Hall
 Honhui Plaza shopping mall
 Xinzhuang Joint Office Tower
 Council of Indigenous Peoples
 Hakka Affairs Council
 Ministry of Culture
 Xinzhuang Sub-city Center (Xinzhuang Fuduxin)
 Zhongping Junior High School
 Zhongping Elementary School

References

2017 establishments in Taiwan
Railway stations opened in 2017
Taoyuan Airport MRT stations
Transportation in New Taipei
Buildings and structures in New Taipei